Ryan Schoenmakers (born 8 November 1990) is a former professional Australian rules footballer who played for the Hawthorn Football Club in the Australian Football League (AFL).  He was selected with the last pick of the first round selections, pick 16, in the 2008 AFL Draft.

Early career 
Schoenmakers started his career with the Tea Tree Gully Football Club. He moved to Norwood as a junior. Schoenmakers played at Centre Half Forward for the South Australian Under 18 side, as well as for Norwood in the South Australian National Football League (SANFL). He is 195 cm tall and weighs 94 kg.

He was impressive at AFL Draft Camp, with the top ranking in the repeat sprints and in the top six in both the 20m sprint (2.90 sec) and standing vertical jump (69 cm).

Schoenmakers attended St Paul's College, situated in the north eastern suburbs of Adelaide.

AFL career 
He made his debut for Hawthorn in the opening round of the 2009 AFL season, in the rematch of the 2008 AFL Grand Final against Geelong.

He was given the nickname "Drago" after his striking resemblance to Dolph Lundgren's character Ivan Drago in the movie Rocky IV.

Schoenmakers ruptured the anterior cruciate ligament (ACL) and strained the medial ligament in his right knee, during the Round 4, 2013 game against  in Launceston. He underwent a knee reconstruction and missed the 2013 premiership.

Schoenmakers returned to the senior side in round 7 of 2014, with coach Alastair Clarkson choosing to play him in the forward line. Schoenmakers kicked four goals in the first half, before returning to the back line after Brian Lake was subbed out. Since this point, Schoenmakers has been used as a swingman between forward and defence.

In the 2015 AFL season he played both in the forward line and in defence, kicking 15 goals in 16 games. In the finals series of 2015 he was not selected in the first final against West coast, but was selected for the next two finals. He was selected for the 2015 Grand Final, playing in the Hawks 46 point victory over the West Coast Eagles.

Schoenmakers missed most of the 2016 season with a groin injury that didn't respond well to treatment. On 28 August 2017, Schoenmakers signed a one-year contract extension to stay at Hawthorn until the end of 2018.

A reoccurring Achilles issue plagued Schoenmakers over the later part of his career. On 18 October 2019, Schoenmakers announced his retirement from the AFL.

Statistics

|- style=background:#EAEAEA
| 2009 ||  || 25
| 13 || 1 || 0 || 64 || 64 || 128 || 33 || 38 || 0.1 || 0.0 || 4.9 || 4.9 || 9.9 || 2.5 || 2.9 || 0
|-
| 2010 ||  || 25
| 11 || 0 || 2 || 79 || 43 || 122 || 45 || 30 || 0.0 || 0.2 || 7.2 || 3.9 || 11.1 || 4.1 || 2.7 || 0
|- style=background:#EAEAEA
| 2011 ||  || 25
| 11 || 0 || 0 || 104 || 47 || 151 || 59 || 31 || 0.0 || 0.0 || 9.5 || 4.3 || 13.7 || 5.4 || 2.8 || 0
|-
| 2012 ||  || 25
| 25 || 4 || 2 || 211 || 139 || 350 || 120 || 43 || 0.2 || 0.1 || 8.4 || 5.6 || 14.0 || 4.8 || 2.0 || 0
|- style=background:#EAEAEA
| 2013 ||  || 25
| 4 || 0 || 0 || 27 || 26 || 53 || 16 || 6 || 0.0 || 0.0 || 6.8 || 6.5 || 13.3 || 4.0 || 1.5 || 0
|-
| 2014 ||  || 25
| 15 || 8 || 4 || 141 || 69 || 210 || 70 || 30 || 0.5 || 0.3 || 9.4 || 4.6 || 14.0 || 4.7 || 2.0 || 0
|- style=background:#EAEAEA
| bgcolor=F0E68C | 2015# ||  || 25
| 16 || 15 || 5 || 124 || 76 || 200 || 69 || 41 || 0.9 || 0.3 || 7.8 || 4.8 || 12.5 || 4.3 || 2.6 || 0
|-
| 2016 ||  || 25
| 6 || 3 || 3 || 30 || 20 || 50 || 14 || 6 || 0.5 || 0.5 || 5.0 || 3.3 || 8.3 || 2.3 || 1.0 || 0
|- style=background:#EAEAEA
| 2017 ||  || 25
| 11 || 11 || 8 || 79 || 45 || 124 || 49 || 14 || 1.0 || 0.7 || 7.2 || 4.1 || 11.3 || 4.5 || 1.3 || 0
|-
| 2018 ||  || 25
| 9 || 9 || 7 || 51 || 31 || 82 || 28 || 16 || 1.0 || 0.8 || 5.7 || 3.4 || 9.1 || 3.1 || 1.8 || 0
|- style=background:#EAEAEA
| 2019 ||  || 25
| 0 || — || — || — || — || — || — || — || — || — || — || — || — || — || — || 0
|- class="sortbottom"
! colspan=3| Career
! 121 !! 51 !! 31 !! 910 !! 560 !! 1470 !! 503 !! 255 !! 0.4 !! 0.3 !! 7.5 !! 4.6 !! 12.1 !! 4.2 !! 2.1 !! 0
|}

Honours and achievements
Team
 AFL premiership player: 2015
 2× Minor premiership: 2012, 2013
 Minor premiership: 2015

Individual
  life member

Notes

External links

 

Australian people of Dutch descent
Hawthorn Football Club players
Hawthorn Football Club Premiership players
Norwood Football Club players
Box Hill Football Club players
1990 births
Living people
Australian rules footballers from South Australia
One-time VFL/AFL Premiership players